USS Beatty (DD-756), an , was the second ship of the United States Navy to be named for Admiral Frank Beatty.

The second Beatty (DD-756) was launched on 30 November 1944 by Bethlehem Steel Co., Staten Island, New York; sponsored by Mrs. Charles H. Drayton, daughter, and Miss Mary Drayton, granddaughter of Admiral Beatty; and commissioned on 31 March 1945.

History
Beatty reported to Commander, Operational Training Command, Atlantic Fleet, 22 June 1945 for duty as a training ship. She operated in Chesapeake Bay and made one cruise to the Caribbean between June and November. On 10 November 1945 she departed Norfolk, Virginia for the Pacific, arriving at San Diego on 25 November. She remained on the west coast until the end of March 1946 when she rejoined the Atlantic Fleet.

Between February and August 1947 Beatty cruised in Northern European waters. She conducted her first tour in the Mediterranean between September 1948 and January 1949. While in the Mediterranean she served on patrol duty, based at Haifa, Israel, during the Arab-Israeli dispute. Retiring to the east coast Beatty operated out of Melville and Newport, Rhode Island, along the eastern seaboard, and in the Caribbean and Gulf of Mexico until March 1951 when she returned to the Mediterranean. This cruise lasted until June.

On 2 October 1951 Beatty departed Newport for Yokosuka, Japan, via the Panama Canal. Upon arrival 31 October 1951, she joined Task Force 77 for patrol and blockade duty off the east coast of Korea. During November she participated in shore bombardments of Wonsan, Chongjin, Songjin, and Tanchon. On 15 February she again bombarded targets at Wonsan. On 27 February 1952 she departed Yokosuka. Sailing via Hong Kong, Singapore, and Colombo, Ceylon, she transited the Suez Canal for a brief tour of the Mediterranean. She departed Cannes, France, 12 April and arrived at Newport 21 April 1952.

Beatty remained active with the Atlantic Fleet. She made several tours of the Mediterranean, as a unit of the 6th Fleet, and conducted local operations, type training, and training cruises along the eastern seaboard and in the Caribbean.

Beatty received two battle stars for her Korean service.

References

External links 
   navsource.org: USS Beatty
        hazegray.org: USS Beatty

Allen M. Sumner-class destroyers of the United States Navy
Ships built in Staten Island
1944 ships
Cold War destroyers of the United States
Korean War destroyers of the United States
Ships transferred from the United States Navy to the Bolivarian Navy of Venezuela
Allen M. Sumner-class destroyers of the Bolivarian Navy of Venezuela